Strong Republic may refer to:

Strong Republic, a slogan used in the Philippines during the presidency of Gloria Macapagal Arroyo
Strong Republic (Lebanon), a bloc among the members of the 2018–22 Lebanese Parliament

See also
Strong Republic Transit System, a public transit project in Manila, Philippines
Strong Republic Nautical Highway, an integrated network of highway and vehicular ferry routes in the Philippines